NFL Replay is a program that airs on the official television channel of the National Football League, NFL Network.

This is not to be confused with NFL Films Game of the Week, which aired on NFL Network each Friday night in 2006.  That one-hour program, which only used footage from NFL Films, has been canceled by the network, but aired on ION Television in 2007.

Four of the week's games, as selected by network representatives, are rebroadcast in an edited format with the following schedule:

 Game 1: Tuesday, 8 p.m. and 1 a.m. (early Wednesday)
 Game 2: Tuesday, 9:30 p.m.
 Game 3: Wednesday, 8 p.m. and 1 a.m. (early Thursday)
 Game 4: Wednesday, 9:30 p.m.
All times are Eastern.

Format
Games are compressed into fast-paced 1½-hour programs.  In addition to the original Fox, CBS, NBC, ESPN, or NFL Network broadcast, NFL Replay shows camera angles of certain plays as captured by NFL Films, as well as sound from players and coaches before, during, and after each game.

Program history
The first episode was a rebroadcast of the Pittsburgh Steelers' win over the Miami Dolphins.  The game took place on September 7, 2006 and was re-aired on September 9.
When the show debuted, GMC sponsored the NFL Films camera angle replays.
On October 19, 2006, NFL Replay presented a fifth game for the first time.  It was the Chicago Bears defeating the Arizona Cardinals, 24-23.  The Bears were the first team in NFL history to win a game after trailing by 20 points at any point despite not scoring an offensive touchdown in the entire game.  This was also the first re-broadcast of a Monday night game in this manner.
The show was advertised with a light-hearted campaign which features  a number of NFL players singing, dancing, with cheerleaders. The players were Chad Johnson, Tony Gonzalez, Willis McGahee, Clinton Portis, Warren Sapp, Ray Lewis, Keyshawn Johnson and Jeremy Shockey.
Originally, NFL Replay consisted of four episodes per week.  As of Oct. 19, a fifth weekly episode was added, bumping NFL Cheerleader Playoffs to Saturday afternoons.  This fifth showing continued until Run to the Playoffs, the first live NFL game action, debuted on November 23.
Around New Year's Day 2007, NFL Replay added analysis by Brian Baldinger and Solomon Wilcots using the "Playbook" feature.
For the 2007 season, a fifth game was added to the regular schedule.  Previously, a fifth game aired occasionally; if it were added, it was shown on Thursday nights.  Also, the show no longer used an on-camera host, which had usually been Fran Charles, and the Playbook segments were removed as that show was restored to the network's lineup.  Some elements are now handled by an off-camera narrator.
In 2008, NFL Network removed the Monday game from the schedule and returned to only four games per week.  However, a spin-off show, NFL Replay Real-Time, was added to the schedule.  The program shows Sunday afternoon highlights in the exact order that they occurred during the day.  NFL Replay Real-Time premieres every Monday at 7:30 p.m. Eastern time and airs in the hour before Monday Night Football starts on ESPN.
Since the 2010 season, actor Mike Rock has been the off-camera narrator.

External links
 

Replay
2010s American television series
2006 American television series debuts